Tom and the Slice of Bread with Strawberry Jam and Honey (German title: Tom und das Erdbeermarmeladebrot mit Honig) is a German animated television series for children ages 3–8 years, created by Andreas Hykade. The series also airs in the United States in Spanish on TV network V-me. The first season consisted of 13 episodes. From 2008, three more seasons were created, each with 13 episodes.

Premise 
The protagonist of the show is Tom, who is always on the lookout for a slice of bread with strawberry jam and honey and almost ends up with exactly half a loaf that he "tastes as good as if it were a whole". On his searches, Tom regularly meets various friends.

Characters

Main characters 
 Tom - The main protagonist of the show.
 The miller - Tom's best friend, who usually gives him flour for his bread. His pet is a magical pig that helps him with his work.
 Tom's mother - From her, Tom gets "delicious well water" for baking bread and who wears the wig.
 The strawberry mouse - Proud and rather miserly owner of a large strawberry field.
 The crocodile - It is a good friend of the strawberry mouse and "internationally recognized strawberry squeezer", "internationally recognized abdominal trainer", "internationally recognized crocodile washer", "internationally recognized screwdriver", "internationally recognized strawberry cake baker", "internationally recognized strawberry planter" and so on.
 The three bees - They are mostly in a bad mood, but every now and then Tom can get them some honey.

Recurring characters

See also
List of German television series

External links
 

2005 German television series debuts
2012 German television series endings
German children's animated television series
German-language television shows